The 2021 season was Viking's 3rd consecutive year in Eliteserien, and their 71st season in the top flight of Norwegian football. The club participated in the Eliteserien and the Norwegian Cup. It was the club's first season with Bjarte Lunde Aarsheim and Morten Jensen as managers. Viking ended the Eliteserien season in 3rd place, the club's first top-three finish since 2007.

Season events

Pre-season
Bjarne Berntsen left his position as manager after the 2020 season, being replaced by Bjarte Lunde Aarsheim and Morten Jensen, who took over as joint managers on 1 January 2021. 

In March 2021, Stig Christiansen was reinstated as chairman of the club, a position he also held between 2017 and 2020.

On 11 March 2021, the 2021 Eliteserien season, that was due to start on 5 April, was postponed by one month due to the COVID-19 pandemic in Norway. On 31 March, the new start date for the league was announced to be 8 May 2021.

On 15 March, Viking confirmed the signing of forward Mai Traore from Vasalunds IF. Traore joined the team on 2 August 2021. Viking also signed winger Kevin Kabran and left-back Shayne Pattynama ahead of the season. On 7 May 2021, fan favourite Zlatko Tripić returned to the club, after one year with Turkish side Göztepe.

May
Viking started the Eliteserien season with a 3–1 home win against Brann on 9 May 2021, before losing 5–0 to Rosenborg at Lerkendal Stadion four days later. The bad result against Rosenborg was followed by another loss, this time against newly promoted Tromsø on 16 May 2021. Viking lost the match 1–0. Viking managed to bounce back in the next game, winning 3–1 away from home against Lillestrøm, in a game where Zlatko Tripić scored his first goal after his return to the club. The next match also resulted in a victory, 2–1 over Mjøndalen on 27 May 2021. Three days later, Viking travelled to Rogaland rivals Haugesund with confidence after two back-to-back wins, but the winning streak came to an end, as Haugesund won the match 4–2.

June
Viking returned to winning ways in the following game, defeating Vålerenga 4–1 on 13 June 2021. Veton Berisha played a central role in the victory, scoring two of the goals and providing two assists. Viking then suffered a 3–0 loss to 16th-placed Sandefjord on 19 June 2021, before defeating Sarpsborg 08 2–1 six days later. The following game resulted in the club's first draw of the season, 3–3 at home to Stabæk on 30 June 2021.

July
Three days later, Viking drew 2–2 against reigning league champions Bodø/Glimt at Aspmyra Stadion. Veton Berisha scored both of the goals for Viking. On 10 July 2021, Viking drew their third game in a row, 1–1 against Strømsgodset, after a late equalizer by Zlatko Tripić. One week later, Viking lost 3–2 away to Odd. The goalscorers for Viking were Harald Nilsen Tangen and Veton Berisha. On 25 July 2021, Viking won 3–2 against Staal Jørpeland in the first round of the 2021–22 Norwegian Cup. Former Viking player Even Østensen scored the goals for Staal Jørpeland.

August
On 1 August 2021, Viking defeated Djerv 1919 2–0 in the second round of the Norwegian Cup. Veton Berisha scored a brace which secured the victory for Viking. On 8 August 2021, Viking won 3–2 against Kristiansund. Two of the goals were scored by Zlatko Tripić, while Sebastian Sebulonsen scored one goal. The next day, Viking confirmed the signing of Gianni Stensness from Australian club Central Coast Mariners. On 11 August, Viking signed David Brekalo from Slovenian club Bravo. On 15 August, Viking won 3–2 against top-of-the-league Molde. Viking were 2–0 down after the first half, but managed to turn it around in the second half, after goals from Kevin Kabran, Zlatko Tripić and David Brekalo. Viking drew the next game 1–1 against Vålerenga in Oslo, before defeating Rosenborg 2–1 at home on 29 August. The next day, Viking confirmed the signing of Patrik Gunnarsson on loan from Brentford. The same day, Henrik Heggheim was sold to Danish club Brøndby.

September
Following four unbeaten league games in August, Viking continued their unbeaten run on 11 September, beating Stabæk 3–1 at Nadderud Stadion. Viking's unbeaten run came to an end eight days later, after losing 3–1 to Bodø/Glimt. The third round of the cup was played on 22 September against Rosenborg. The match ended 3–1 in favour of Viking. The following fixture resulted in a 2–2 draw to Molde on 26 September — the first time Viking managed to get a point at Aker Stadion in five years.

October
On 2 October, Viking defeated Sandefjord 2–1 in front of 14,105 spectators. Viking had to play the majority of the match with ten men, after goalkeeper Patrik Gunnarsson received a red card after 18 minutes. Viking followed up the Sandefjord win with another three points, this time against Strømsgodset at Marienlyst Stadion. Kristoffer Løkberg scored the only goal of the game. On 23 October, Viking won 5–1 against Lillestrøm. Veton Berisha scored a hat-trick, while Harald Nilsen Tangen and Sebastian Sebulonsen scored one each. The following game resulted in a 2–0 win away to Brann at Brann Stadion, a game that was characterised by heavy rain and bad playing conditions. October was concluded with a 2–1 loss at home to Sarpsborg 08, ending a streak of four wins in a row.

November
The first match in November was against Mjøndalen on 7 November. Viking won 1–0 after Veton Berisha converted a penalty in added time. On 20 November, Viking drew 1–1 at home to Haugesund. Veton Berisha scored Viking's goal, his 20th league goal of the season. Viking won the next match 3–2 against Kristiansund on 28 November. Two late goals from Veton Berisha and Sondre Bjørshol gave Viking the win.

December
The last home match of the season was against Odd on 5 December. Viking won 3–1 and secured a top-three finish in the league for the first time since 2007. The Eliteserien season was concluded with a 2–0 win against Tromsø on 12 December. Viking received their bronze medals after the match. Third place also granted the club a spot in the qualification stage of the 2022–23 UEFA Europa Conference League.

Squad

Out on loan

Transfers

Transfers in

Transfers out

Loans in

Loans out

Notes

Friendlies

Pre-season
The following four friendly matches were announced on 6 April.

Mid-season

Competitions

Eliteserien

Table

Results summary

Results by round

Matches
The Eliteserien fixtures were announced on 1 April.

Norwegian Cup

The pair-ups for the first round were announced on 25 June 2021. The pair-ups for the second round were announced on 26 July 2021. The draw for the third round was held on 5 August 2021. In the fourth round, Viking played against Kongsvinger. The match was played in the 2022 season.

Squad statistics

Appearances and goals

|-
|colspan="14"|Players who left Viking during the season:

|}

References

Viking FK seasons
Viking